GYC may stand for:

Education 
 Gangneung Yeongdong University, in Gangwon-do, South Korea
 Great Yarmouth College, in Norfolk, England
 Guilford Young College, in Hobart, Tasmania, Australia

Other uses 
 Gaur Yamuna City, Uttar Pradesh, India
 Generation of Youth for Christ, an Adventist movement
 Greenwich Yacht Club, in London